Mark Buehner (born 1959 in Salt Lake City) is an illustrator of children's books. Buehner has illustrated award-winning children's books such as Snowmen at Night, Fanny's Dream, Superdog, The Adventures of Taxi Dog, The Escape of Marvin the Ape, The Queen of Style, and Balloon Farm.  He won a "Best Picture Book" from Publishers Weekly for My Life with the Wave (1998).

Buehner's wife, Caralyn, authored some of the books Buehner has illustrated.

Buehner will commonly add hidden images to his illustrations, such as rabbits, cats, and dinosaurs.

External links
  (Mark and Caralyn Buehner)
Mark Buehner at publisher HarperCollins Australia
 
 Caralyn Buehner at LC Authorities, with 20 records 

1959 births
Living people
American children's book illustrators
Artists from Salt Lake City
Date of birth missing (living people)